Runnin' Wild is a collaboration album by American guitarist Tony Rice, mandolinist Larry Rice, guitar and banjo player Herb Pedersen and guitar/bass player Chris Hillman. 
This "Anti-supergroup", as they call themselves, has already issued three volumes of music together. They blend folk music, progressive bluegrass and contemporary country and this album contains both original songs as well as country classics.

Track listing 
 "San Antone" (Hillman) 2:35
 "You're Running Wild" (Edenton, Winters) 2:03
 "Things We Said Today" (Lennon, McCartney) 2:52
 "4+20" (Stills) 3:12
 "Two of a Kind" (Ims) 3:06
 "Just Passin' Through" (Hillman) 2:41
 "The Mystery That Won't Go Away" (Rice) 3:12
 "Take Me Back Again" (Owens) 2:43
 "Maybe She'll Get Lucky" (Hillman) 2:42
 "Hard Hearted" (Mc Reynolds) 2:56
 "It's A Long Way to the Top of the World" (Wayne) 3:05
 "About Love" (Rice) 4:15

Personnel
 Tony Rice – guitar
 Larry Rice – mandolin, vocals
 Chris Hillman – mandolin, bass, vocals
 Herb Pedersen – banjo, guitar, vocals

with
 Fred Travers – Dobro
 Bob Warford – electric guitar
 Jay Dee Maness – steel guitar
 Ronnie Simpkins – bass
 Rickie Simpkins – violin

References

2001 albums
Tony Rice albums
Rounder Records albums